The Degraded is the second film by Alexander Sokurov. It was released in 1980 and is of 30 minutes duration.

Background
This film was Sokurov's first feature at Lenfilm. It was roughly based on a short story by the contemporary Soviet writer, Grigory Baklanov. Baklanov asked that his name be removed from the credits because the only motif that was adopted from Baklanov's work was the scene of the transitional period from power to subordinance. The amateur Ilya Rivin played the main character and appeared in three further movies by Sokurov.

Miscellanea
Sokurov's first film, The Lonely Voice of Man appears in The Degraded when the protagonist is in a movie theater; the Soviet authorities had yet to acknowledge the existence of Sokurov's earlier film.

References

External links
Sokurov's website
 

1980 films
1980 in the Soviet Union
Films directed by Alexander Sokurov
Lenfilm films
1980s Russian-language films
Soviet short films
1980 short films
Films based on short fiction